is a horizontal shooter video game by Irem for the PlayStation 2 video game console. It was planned to be the last mainline game in the R-Type series. However, R-Type Tactics was released for the PlayStation Portable in 2007, and the direct sequel R-Type Final 2 was announced on March 30, 2019, and was released on April 29, 2021.

Story
Final takes place after several long wars against the Bydo, the main antagonist in the R-Type series. The player's first mission is to investigate a mysterious enemy inside a crashed space colony, the remnants of a large battle codenamed Operation Last Dance, a previous attempt to wipe out the Bydo once and for all. This investigative theme is incorporated throughout the game as each level is considered 'research' on the Bydo and unlocks a gallery of in-universe artwork and additional playable ships. Levels are prefaced with hints of the R-Type universe in the form of poetry.

Eventually the player is tasked with finishing where Operation Last Dance left off, and their success with their task is determined by which route the player takes. The primary route sees the player confront the heart of the Bydo, sacrificing themselves and their ship to destroy it in a last stand. One of the alternate routes turns the player ship into a Bydo, and pits the player against their former allies. The final alternate route sees the player taken to the future to fight against an unrelenting wave of Bydo forces with no way to continue once they die.

Gameplay
Final provides 101 playable ships, including altered versions of ships appearing in previous R-Type games, together with many original ones. They are unlocked through a branching system accessed via the R Museum, which was originally featured in R-Types. The PlayStation 2's internal clock is incorporated into each ship's development history (shown through a commemorative plaque) when certain in-game tasks are completed. For example, ships unlocked in 2008 will be seen in the game as having been rolled out in 2168.

The level physicality and enemies change size and character depending on the difficulty setting chosen by the player, providing different flight paths and playing experience for each level.

Reception

R-Type Final received "generally favorable" reviews, according to a review aggregator website Metacritic.

In a special edition of Edge magazine, listing their 100 top videogames of all-time, R-Type Final was the only horizontal shooter on the list.

References

External links

R Type Final screenshots and reviews

2003 video games
Eidos Interactive games
Horror video games
PlayStation 2 games
PlayStation 2-only games
R-Type
Video game sequels
Video games set in the 22nd century
Video games developed in Japan
Horizontally scrolling shooters
Science fiction video games
Single-player video games
Irem games
Metro3D games